99 may refer to:
 99 (number), the natural number following 98 and preceding 100
 one of the years 99 BC, AD 99, 1999, 2099, etc.

Art, entertainment, and media
 The 99, a comic series based on Islamic culture

Film, television and radio
 99 (1918 film), a Hungarian film
 99 (2009 film), an Indian Hindi film
 99 (2019 film), an Indian Kannada film
 The 99 (TV series), a 2011–2012 animated series
 Agent 99, a fictional character in the 1960s American TV series Get Smart
 WNNX (99X), classic "Rock 100.5" FM, in Atlanta, Georgia
 Brooklyn Nine-Nine, an American television police sitcom based in the fictional 99th precinct of the NYPD
 99 (Brooklyn Nine-Nine episode)
 99, a clone trooper character from Star Wars: The Clone Wars

Games
 '99: The Last War, a renamed version of the arcade game Repulse
 Ninety-nine (addition card game), a simple card game where players drop out if forced to bring the total above 99
 Ninety-nine (trick-taking card game), a card game where players bid by discarding three cards

Music
 99 Records, a record label

Performers
 Ninety-nine (owarai), a Japanese comedic duo known for their show Mecha-Mecha Iketeru!
 ninetynine, an Australian indie band
 9nine, a Japanese idol J-Pop group

Albums
 99 (Epik High album), 2012
 99 (No-Big-Silence album), 1997

Songs
 "99" (song), 1979, by Toto
 "99" (Fightstar song), 2007
 "99" (Ruth Lorenzo song), 2015
 "99", 2004, by The Haunted from the album rEVOLVEr
 "99 Bottles of Beer", a folk song
 "99 Times", 2009, by Kate Voegele
 "99 Luftballons" (German Neunundneunzig Luftballons, means "99 balloons" in English), 1983, by Nena
 "99 Problems", 2004, by Jay-Z
 "Ninety-Nine" (song), 1959 by Bill Anderson

Commercial brands
 99, a line of schnapps fruit brandy produced by Barton Brands
 99 (app), a brand of mobile transport software
 99 Flake, also known as "99", a type of ice cream served with a chocolate flake
 Saab 99, a car

Science
 Atomic number 99: einsteinium
 Messier 99, aka M99, a spiral galaxy in the constellation Coma Berenices
 NGC 99, an NGC object, a spiral galaxy in the constellation Pisces
 STS-99, a Space Shuttle Endeavour mission launched in 2000

Sports
 99, the only number retired league-wide in the National Hockey League, in honor of Wayne Gretzky
 99 call, a rugby union strategy used in the 1974 British Lions tour to South Africa
 Graz 99ers, an Austrian ice hockey team from the city of Graz

Other uses
 .99, a common price ending in psychological pricing
 99 Names of Allah, the names or attributes of God in the Qur'an
 Ninety-Nines, an organization for female pilots founded by Amelia Earhart and others

See also
 99% (disambiguation)
 99ers, U.S. Citizens who have exhausted all their unemployment benefits
 99ers, the 1999 U.S. Women's soccer team 
 99X (disambiguation)
 A99 (disambiguation)
 List of highways numbered 99